Ildar Rinasovich Arslanov (born 6 April 1994) is a Russian former professional racing cyclist, who competed professionally between 2014 and 2019 for the  and  teams.

Major results

2011
 1st  Road race, National Junior Road Championships
2012
 1st  Road race, National Junior Road Championships
 2nd Overall Grand Prix Rüebliland
2013
 5th Overall Grand Prix of Adygeya
2014
 1st Stage 4 (ITT) Giro della Valle d'Aosta
2015
 7th GP Capodarco
 9th Trofeo Banca Popolare di Vicenza
2016
 5th Overall Tour d'Azerbaïdjan
1st  Young rider classification
2017
 5th Overall Tour of Turkey
2018
 3rd Overall Adriatica Ionica Race
 9th Overall Tour of Slovenia
2019
 4th Overall Sibiu Cycling Tour
 8th Trofeo Laigueglia

References

External links
 

1994 births
Living people
People from Bashkortostan
Russian male cyclists
Sportspeople from Bashkortostan